Tropical Storm Hermine caused significant flooding in Mexico during September 1980. The eleventh tropical cyclone and eight named storm of the 1980 Atlantic hurricane season, Hermine developed from a tropical wave that emerged into the Atlantic from the west coast of Africa on September 11. After uneventfully crossing the Atlantic Ocean, the system developed a well-defined circulation while in the Caribbean Sea on September 20 and was then classified as a tropical depression. After becoming a tropical cyclone, the depression steadily strengthened as it tracked nearly due westward. By September 21, it strengthened into Tropical Storm Hermine and brushed the northern coast of Honduras shortly thereafter. It nearly became a hurricane before it made landfall in Belize on September 22. After weakening over the Yucatan Peninsula, Hermine restrengthened to near-hurricane status again over the Gulf of Mexico before making landfall in the Mexican state of Veracruz. Hermine steadily weakened inland and eventually dissipated on September 26.

In Belize, the storm knocked out communications, though damage in that country was minimal. Heavy rainfall in Guatemala triggered landslides, causing eight fatalities. Additionally, portions of the Pan-American Highway were shut down due to flooding. At the capital city of Mexico City, ten districts reported significant street flooding. As a result of torrential rainfall, at least 30 fatalities occurred, with dozens more missing, and leaving 25,000 homeless. However, no estimates of damage associated with the storm were produced.

Meteorological history

A tropical wave emerged into the Atlantic from the west coast of Africa on September 11, though the system lacked a well-defined circulation. The tropical wave tracked westward for several days with minimal development, until reaching near the Lesser Antilles where a low-level cloud banding feature appeared, along with an increase in central convection. This suggested a possible low-level circulation, though an Air Force Reserve Flight on September 17 indicated little evidence of a circulation. On the following day, the system crossed the Lesser Antilles and entered the Caribbean Sea. As it passed near Jamaica on September 20, a low-level circulation became more apparent on satellite imagery. However, the National Hurricane Center did not initiate advisories until 2200 UTC on September 20. The depression tracked just north of due west, and by September 21, it was upgraded to Tropical Storm Hermine.

An Air Force Reserve flight investigated if landfall occurred, though Hermine had remained offshore. After the storm moved to the northwest away from Honduras, it began to significantly strengthen. Shortly thereafter, Hermine made landfall near Belize City at the same intensity. The storm weakened somewhat over the Yucatán Peninsula, and sustained winds were  when Hermine emerged into the Bay of Campeche on September 23. The storm quickly began to re-strengthen as it tracked generally westward in the Gulf of Mexico. Although several computer models suggested a northward turn, Hermine drifted southwestward, possibly due to high terrain over Mexico. After peak intensity, Hermine weakened slightly to a  tropical storm. At 1200 UTC on September 24, the storm made landfall near Coatzacoalcos, Veracruz, Mexico. Hermine steadily weakened inland and by late 1500 UTC on September 25, it was downgraded to a tropical depression. Later that day, the National Hurricane Center noted that a low-level circulation could no longer be located, and by early on the following day, Hermine dissipated over the Mexican state of Oaxaca.

Impact

On September 21, the government of Belize issued a gale warning, as well as a hurricane watch, for most of the eastern coast of the country. It was canceled after Tropical Storm Hermine had moved inland. In eastern Mexico, an estimated 15,000 people evacuated from low-lying areas. Additionally, the Government of Mexico sent "advices" to "interests" in the Yucatan Peninsula. Officials in Mexico urged numerous residents along the southern Gulf of Mexico coast and surrounding states to evacuate prior to the storm's arrival. Timely warnings were later credited for reducing the loss of life.

While crossing the southern Yucatán Peninsula, Hermine brought locally heavy rains and strong winds to eastern Mexico and much of Belize – then a colony of the United Kingdom. Between  of rain fell at the Philip S. W. Goldson International Airport. The storm also temporarily knocked out communication to all of Belize and Chetumal, Mexico. According to officials in the region, little damage took place during Hermine's passage. Heavy rains in Guatemala triggered landslides, killing at least eight people after crushing a bus. Portions of the Pan American Highway were shut down due to debris.

Tropical Storm Hermine and the remnants caused heavy rainfall across along most of the southern and eastern parts of Mexico. When the remnants of Hermine reached the Pacific coast of Mexico, several inches of rain were recorded. Throughout the country, the hardest hit areas were Veracruz, Oaxaca, Chiapas and Guerrero. More than 30 people were killed by the storm and dozens more left missing. Ten districts in Mexico City were brought to a standstill as flood waters blocked off streets. In the small towns of Cintalapa and Jiquiplan, flooding killed eight people and left twenty more missing. In addition to the loss of life, at least 25,000 residents were left homeless due to severe flooding. Two small dams broke due to excessive rains near Tuxtla Gutiérrez, prompting the evacuation of 2,000 residents in nearby areas. In response to the storm, an estimated 15,000 personnel were deployed to assist in relief efforts.

See also

Tropical Storm Barry (2013)
Tropical Storm Harvey (2011)
1980 Atlantic hurricane season
Other tropical cyclones named Hermine

References

External links
The NHC's archive on Tropical Storm Hermine
Tropical Storm Hermine Preliminary Report

1980 Atlantic hurricane season
Hurricanes in Belize
Hurricanes in Honduras
Atlantic hurricanes in Mexico
Atlantic tropical storms
1980 in Mexico
Hermine